The Blue Notebook is a 1963 Soviet drama film directed by Lev Kulidzhanov.

Plot 
The film takes place in the summer of 1917. Vladimir Lenin leaves Petrograd and, together with Grigory Zinoviev, hides in a hut in Razliv. There he begins work on his famous The Blue Notebook, realizing that revolution is necessary for Russia.

Cast 
 Mikhail Kuznetsov as V.I. Lenin
 Mark Nikelberg as Zinovyev
 Nikolay Lebedev as Nikolay Aleksandrovich Emelyanov
 Aleksandr Paleev as Sverdlov
 Vasiliy Livanov as Dzherzhinsky 
 Boris Tokarev as Kondratiy
 Vitaly Churkin as Kolya Yemelyanov
 Boris Tokarev as Kondratiy Yemelyanov
 Anatoliy Antosevich as Aleksandr Yemelyanov
 Vitaliy Matveev as Aleksey

References

External links 
 

1963 films
1960s Russian-language films
Soviet drama films
1963 drama films